GZA (born 1966) is an American hip hop artist and member of the Wu-Tang Clan.

GZA may also refer to:
 Greater Zurich Area
 Green Zionist Alliance
 Yasser Arafat International Airport, Palestine
 Guangzhou Academy, the academy team of Guangzhou Charge, Overwatch League